is a Japanese superhero anime television series produced by Madhouse and Walt Disney Japan, based on the Marvel Comics universe. The first season began airing on the Dlife satellite channel in July 2017 and ran for 26 episodes, followed by a 13 episode second season in 2018. The series was released internationally via Disney+ in February 2020.

Premise 
The series follows Makoto, Adi, and Chloe, three teenagers who have been raised by Hydra to believe that they are being trained to become superheroes and that the Avengers are villains. The three have been genetically modified by Hydra, resulting in each gaining the unique superhuman abilities of air manipulation, technology control, and shapeshifting respectively. Upon being sent out on a mission for the first time, Adi and Chloe come to realize Hydra's evil intentions and decide to leave the organization, and get Makoto to join their escape attempt. Makoto becomes the only one who gets away, and he goes to Tony Stark seeking help to save Adi and Chloe. Tony brings in the other Avengers, and with Makoto's help, they succeed in defeating Hydra, liberating Adi and Chloe. Realizing the potential they have, the Avengers decide to take the three in and train them to become superheroes, dubbing the team the "Future Avengers". While training the new recruits, the Avengers also seek to learn more about the "Emerald Rain Project", a dangerous scheme being orchestrated by Hydra and the Masters of Evil, and what connection it has to Makoto. The matter becomes further complicated when Bruno, another genetically-modified teen and also Makoto's former training partner, is manipulated into joining the Masters of Evil's ranks.

In the show's second season, exposure to Terrigen Mist in the wake of Kang the Conqueror's defeat leads to several humans developing superpowers. With anti-Inhuman sentiment on the rise and the Inhuman royal family claiming custody of the afflicted, the Avengers and Future Avengers must manage the fallout of the outbreak and attempt to broker peace between Earth and Attilan before they are forced to go to war.

Voice cast

Production 
The series was first announced in February 2017 for broadcast on Disney's Dlife satellite channel the following summer. The series' premiere date, cast and staff were later confirmed the following May. Yūzō Satō, the director of Marvel Anime: Iron Man, was announced as the series director, with Takahiro Umehara providing the character designs. Ryū King, the lead writer on 2014's Marvel Disk Wars: The Avengers, returned to write Marvel Future Avengers; the Disk Wars voice cast also reprise their respective roles. In January 2018, the series was renewed for a second season, which premiered in July of that same year. The anime was later announced for a western release via Disney+, with the first season added on February 28, 2020, and the second season on May 22, 2020.

Outside of the anime series, a Marvel Future Avengers manga series by Teruaki Mizuno ran from April 2017 to February 2018 in Shogakukan's CoroCoro Comic Special magazine. The characters subsequently made their Marvel Comics debut in the Future Fight Firsts miniseries, released in October 2019.

Episodes

Season 1

Season 2

See also 

 Marvel Anime
 Marvel Disk Wars: The Avengers

References

External links 
 
 
 

2017 anime television series debuts
Anime based on comics
Animated television series based on Marvel Comics
Avengers (comics) television series
Disney Channels Worldwide original programming
Disney XD original programming
Madhouse (company)
Japanese children's animated superhero television series
Superheroes in anime and manga
Television shows based on Marvel Comics